American Cyanamid Co v Ethicon Ltd [1975] UKHL 1 is an English civil procedure case, concerning when an interim injunction may be obtained.

Facts
The claimant and appellant in this case was American Cyanamid, an American company that inter alia held a patent for absorbable surgical sutures. The defendant and respondent in this case was Ethicon Ltd, a British company that wanted to launch a surgical suture in the British market. American Cyanamid claimed that this surgical suture was in breach of their patent.

At first instance, American Cyanamid was granted an interim injunction against Ethicon, preventing Ethicon to use the type of surgical suture at issue until the trial of the patent infringement. 

On appeal of Ethicon, the Court of Appeal discharged the interim injunction. 

American Cyanamid appealed against this decision to the House of Lords. The House of Lords set out detailed guidelines on when courts should grant interim injunctions. In this case, the House of Lords decided that the balance of convenience lay with the appellant, American Cyanamid, and the appeal was allowed.

Judgment
The House of Lords set out the following guidance.

Reception
The second factor (whether damages are an adequate remedy) has been considered subsequently by the Court of Appeal in AB v CD where an interim injunction was upheld even though the contract between the parties contained a liquidated damages clause. The Court held that the damages clause was a secondary obligation between the parties, and the interim injunction served to enforce the primary obligation present in the agreement.

See also
English civil procedure

References

United Kingdom labour case law
English tort case law